Albizuri is a Basque surname. Notable people with the surname include:

Beñat Albizuri (born 1981), Spanish cyclist
Luis Albizuri (1851–1933), Peruvian politician

See also
Claudio Albizuris (born 1981), Guatemalan footballer

Basque-language surnames